The following is a list of albums released by defunct record label Scotti Brothers Records and its subsidiary labels Rock 'n Roll Records, and Street Life Records.

1970s

1977 
 Leif Garrett — Leif Garrett (Atlantic)

1978 
 Leif Garrett — Feel the Need
 John Paul Young — Love Is in the Air (Albert/Ariola)

1979 
 Addrisi Brothers — Ghost Dancer
 Leif Garrett — Same Goes for You
 Ironhorse — Ironhorse
 Ian Lloyd — Goose Bumps
 Survivor — Survivor

1980s

1980 
 Leif Garrett — Can't Explain
 Ironhorse — Everything is Grey
 Fred Knobloch — Why Not Me
 Ian Lloyd — 3WC*

1981 
 Susan Anton — Foxy
 Susan Anton — Killin' Time
 Claudia — Claudia
 Leif Garrett — My Movie Of You
 Doug Kershaw — Instant Hero
 John Schneider — Now Or Never
 John Schneider — White Christmas
 Survivor — Premonition

1982 
 The Dukes of Hazzard soundtrack
 Noel & The Red Wedge — Peer Pressure
 Nowherefast — Nowherefast
 John Schneider — Quiet Man
 Survivor — Eye of the Tiger

1983 
 Big Ric — Big Ric (Rock 'n Roll)
 John Cafferty and the Beaver Brown Band — Eddie and the Cruisers soundtrack
 Felony — The Fanatic (Rock 'n Roll)
 John Schneider — If You Believe
 The Shakin' Pyramids — The Shakin' Pyramids (Rock 'n Roll)
 Survivor — Caught in the Game
 "Weird Al" Yankovic — "Weird Al" Yankovic (Rock 'n Roll)

1984 
 Darque — Jenny's Out Tonight (Rock 'n Roll)
 Revenge of the Nerds soundtrack
 Survivor — Vital Signs
 "Weird Al" Yankovic — "Weird Al" Yankovic in 3-D (Rock 'n Roll)
 Ya Ya — Scarred (Rock 'n Roll)

1985 
 John Cafferty and the Beaver Brown Band — Tough All Over
 Flag — Flag
 Robert Froman — Cat Juggling
 LaMarca — LaMarca
 Jill Michaels — Jill Michaels
 Mountain — Go for Your Life
 [[Rocky IV: Original Motion Picture Soundtrack]|Rocky IV soundtrack]
 "Weird Al" Yankovic — Dare to Be Stupid (Rock 'n Roll)

1986 
 James Brown — Gravity
 Cobra (Original Motion Picture Soundtrack)|Cobra (soundtrack)
 Survivor — When Seconds Count
 Robert Tepper — No Easy Way Out
 The Transformers soundtrack
 "Weird Al" Yankovic — Polka Party! (Rock 'n Roll)
 The Wraith soundtrack

1987 
 Stan Bush & Barrage — Stan Bush & Barrage
 Tim Feehan — Tim Feehan
 He's My Girl soundtrack
 Lady Beware soundtrack
 Lion — Dangerous Attraction

1988 
 James Brown — I'm Real
 John Cafferty and the Beaver Brown Band — Roadhouse
 David Hallyday — True Cool
 Rambo III soundtrack
 Roxanne — Roxanne
 Robert Tepper — Modern Madness
 Survivor — Too Hot to Sleep
 "Weird Al" Yankovic — Even Worse (Rock 'n Roll)

1989 
 James Brown & Friends — Soul Session Live
 Eddie and the Cruisers II: Eddie Lives! soundtrack
 The Funk Club — Funky And Then Some
 Gigi on the Beach — Gigi on the Beach
 Roxanne — Burning Through the Night
 "Weird Al" Yankovic — UHF – Original Motion Picture Soundtrack and Other Stuff (Rock 'n Roll)
 Work Force — Work Force

1990s

1990 
 Another 48 Hrs. soundtrack
 ELO Part II — Electric Light Orchestra Part Two (Telstar)
 David Hallyday — Rock 'n' Heart
 The Northern Pikes — Snow in June
 Tommy Puett — Life Goes On

1991 
 James Brown — Love Over-Due
 Carl King — Bandits
 Cartouche — House Music All Night Long
 Dread Filmstone and the Modern Tone Age Family — From the Ghetto
 Jimi Jamison — When Love Comes Down
 The Nylons — 4 On the Floor (Live in Concert)
 Tag — Contagious

1992 
 Colonel Abrams — About Romance
 AZ-1 — AZ-1
 Blackbird — Blackbird
 John Cafferty and the Beaver Brown Band — Eddie and the Cruisers: Live and in Concert
 David Cassidy — Didn't You Used to Be...
 Cell Mates — Between Two Fires
 David Hallyday — On the Road
 May May — The Introduction
 Mother's Finest — Black Radio Won't Play This Record
 Naked Soul — Seed
 The Nylons — Live to Love
 "Weird Al" Yankovic — Off the Deep End (Rock 'n Roll)

1993 
 James Brown — Universal James
 Michael Damian — Reach Out to Me
 Fabio — Fabio After Dark
 G-Wiz — Naughty Bits
 Trevor Jones — Cliffhanger soundtrack
 Lost City — Watching You
 Naked Soul — Visiting Your Planet
 Spark 950 & Timbo King — United We Slam (Street Life)
 Truck Stop Love — Truck Stop Love (Backyard)
 "Weird Al" Yankovic — Alapalooza (Rock 'n Roll)
 F.O.S. - Big Black Boots

1994 
 12 Gauge — 12 Gauge (Street Life)
 Gerald Alston — First Class Only
 Blind Fish & David Hallyday — 2000 Bdf
 Kolorz — Kolorz
 The Nylons — Because...
 Sweet Sable — Old Times' Sake (Street Life)
 Young Dubliners — Rocky Road (Backyard)

1995 
 12 Gauge — Let Me Ride Again (Street Life)
 Alfonzo Blackwell — Let's Imagine... (Street Life)
 Black 9 — Black 9 (Mix It Up)
 Breakdown — Ain't Nuttin' But Bass
 James Brown — Live at the Apollo 1995
 Gold Teet — The Heat is On (Street Life)
 Freddie Jackson — Private Party (Street Life)
 Tina Moore — Tina Moore (RCA)
 Nais — Str-8 from Da' Boot (Street Life)
 Never Talk to Strangers
 Shiro — Can We Talk (Street Life)
 Skee-Lo — I Wish (Sunshine)
 Truck Stop Love — How I Spent My Summer Vacation (Backyard)
 Young Dubliners — Breathe (Backyard)

1996 
 Big Bully soundtrack]]
 DJ Yella — One Mo Nigga ta Go (Street Life)
 The Nylons — Run for Cover
 "Weird Al" Yankovic — Bad Hair Day

1997 
 Artie The-1-Man Party — Levante Las Manos
 Chris Thomas King — Chris Thomas King

References 

Discographies of American record labels